Pathady / pathadi is a village about 6 km east from Anchal town (Anchal - Kulathupuzha road), east of Kollam district, Kerala state, India.

Location
'Kanjuvayal' the first junction from Anchal side,
'Elavinmoodu',
'Pathady' or 'East Pathady' the third Jn.

Facts 
Country    - India
State      - Kerala
District   - Kollam
Taluk      - Punalur
Panchayath - Yeroor
Village Office - Yeroor

Overview 
 Distance from District Capital Kollam - 42 km
 Distance from Nearest International Airport Thiruvananthapuram - 70 km
 The Nearest Railway Station is at Punalur - 18 km
 The Nearest Major Bus Station is at Anchal - 6 km
 Major Crops are Coconut, Tapiocca & Rubber tree plantation.
 About 75% of south side of this village is of rubber estates.
 Post Office- Bharatheepuram
Yeroor Village Office - 2 km

Attractions

Adappupara, named after the shape of rock formation, is one of the main attraction for people from different parts of religion and managed by the Yeroor Muslim jamaath. The foot prints on the rock is considered to be  holy and believed to be of the Muslim traveller who later died and buried at Adappupara.

Language & Religion 
The Spoken Language is Malayalam, In this village Muslims, Hindus and Christians live together.
There are two Muslim Jamaat in Pathady; 1.Yeroor Muslim Jamaat - The first Jamaat in this village, and 2.Pathady Muslim Jamaat.

References

Home of Fathima travels

Villages in Kollam district